Kaeng Sanam Nang is the northernmost district (amphoe) of Nakhon Ratchasima province, northeastern Thailand.

History
On 7 January 1986 the four tambons Kaeng Sanam Nang, Non Samran, Bueng Phalai, and Si Suk were split off from Bua Yai district and created the minor district (king amphoe) Kaeng Sanam Nang. The government officially upgraded it to a full district on 20 October 1993.

Geography
Neighbouring districts are (from the north clockwise): Mueang Chaiyaphum and Khon Sawan of Chaiyaphum province; Waeng Noi of Khon Kaen province; Bua Yai and Ban Lueam of Nakhon Ratchasima Province.

Administration
The district is divided into five subdistricts (tambon). There are no municipal (thesaban) areas in the district.

References

External links
amphoe.com

Kaeng Sanam Nang